Philip Geoffrey Alston  is an Australian international law scholar and human rights practitioner. He is John Norton Pomeroy Professor of Law at New York University School of Law, and co-chair of the law school's Center for Human Rights and Global Justice. In human rights law, Alston has held a range of senior UN appointments for over two decades, including United Nations Special Rapporteur on extrajudicial, summary or arbitrary executions, a position he held from August 2004 to July 2010, and UN Special Rapporteur on extreme poverty and human rights from 2014-2020.

Background
Alston graduated from the University of Melbourne with an LL.B.(Hons.) in 1972 and from the University of California, Berkeley with an LL.M. in 1976  and a JSD (Doctor of Juridical Science) in 1980.  

His brother is the former Australian federal Cabinet minister and High Commissioner to the United Kingdom, Richard Alston.

Career
Alston's first academic appointments were at Tufts University (1985–89) and Harvard Law School (1984–89). Alston was then professor at the Australian National University (1990–95), and also director of its Center for International and Public Law. He was then professor at the European University Institute (1996–2001), before moving to New York University School of Law, where he is the John Norton Pomeroy Professor of Law and co-chair of the law school's Center for Human Rights and Global Justice. He became a faculty instructor in the NYU Law Institute for Executive Education, which was launched in 2015.

United Nations
In human rights law, Alston has held a range of senior UN appointments for over two decades. From 1986 to 1991 he was the first Rapporteur for the UN Committee on Economic, Social and Cultural Rights; he then chaired the committee from 1991 to 1998. 

At the 1993 World Conference on Human Rights he was elected to chair the first meeting of the presidents and Chairs of all of the international human rights courts and committees (including the European Court of Human Rights, the Inter-American Human Rights Court, the African Commission on Human and Peoples' Rights, and the UN Human Rights Committee).

He was appointed by the United Nations Secretary-General in 1988 to suggest reforms to make the United Nations human rights treaty monitoring system more effective. His major reports in 1989, 1993, and 1997 provided the impetus for continuing efforts by the UN Office of the High Commissioner for Human Rights and the UN Human Rights Council to streamline and improve the rather unwieldy monitoring system.

His other United Nations appointments include Special Adviser to the UN High Commissioner for Human Rights on the Millennium Development Goals. He was appointed to that post by Sergio Vieira de Mello, and has continued to advise successor High Commissioners, including Louise Arbour and Navanethem Pillay.

UNICEF
He has been involved in the field of children's rights and the legal adviser to UNICEF throughout the period of the drafting of the U.N. Convention on the Rights of the Child. He participated in the UNICEF delegation to the drafting sessions of the convention and continued to advise UNICEF for several years after the convention's adoption in 1989, especially in relation to promoting the ratification of the convention by countries around the world.  He published two studies for UNICEF on children's rights. The first was The Best Interests of the Child: Reconciling Culture and Human Rights (1994), and the second, with John Tobin, was Laying the Foundations for Children's Rights, published in 2005 by UNICEF.

Special Rapporteur
On extrajudicial, summary or arbitrary executions
From August 2004 – July 2010 he was the United Nations Special Rapporteur on extrajudicial, summary or arbitrary executions. In that capacity he reported to the UN Human Rights Council and the General Assembly. As Special Rapporteur, Alston visited Nigeria, Sri Lanka, the Philippines, Guatemala, Lebanon, Israel, The Central African Republic, Brazil, Afghanistan, the USA, Kenya, Ecuador, and Colombia, and issued a report in each case to the relevant government and to the United Nations.

Alston's reports to the UN relating to extrajudicial executions also dealt with broad thematic issues that arose in many countries, such as witchcraft and vigilante killings, national-level commissions of inquiry dealing with unlawful killings, the problem of prisoners running prisons, the importance of witness protection programs, the problem of governmental reprisals against individuals or groups who have cooperated with a UN human rights inquiry, the need to regulate the use of lethal force by law enforcement officers, shoot-to-kill policies, the relationship between human rights law and international humanitarian law, mercy killings in times of armed conflict, and the need to make military justice systems compatible with human rights. With respect to the death penalty, Alston's reports discussed the need for transparency, the unacceptability of the mandatory death penalty under international law, the definition of the 'most serious crimes' for which the death penalty may be imposed, the right to seek pardon or commutation of a death sentence, and the juvenile death penalty. 

On extreme poverty and human rights
In 2014, Alston was appointed UN Special Rapporteur on extreme poverty and human rights. In 1998, the OHCHR established the mandate on extreme poverty. In June 2006 the Human Rights Council took over its mandate. Its goals include providing "greater prominence to the plight of those living in extreme poverty and to highlight the human rights consequences of the systematic neglect to which they are all too often subjected."

In May 2015, Alston submitted his first report to the Human Rights Council in his capacity as Special Rapporteur on extreme poverty and human rights. In it, he focused on the "relationship between extreme poverty and extreme inequality and argues that a human rights framework is critical in addressing extreme inequality." He provided "an overview of the widening economic and social inequalities around the world; illustrates how such inequalities stifle equal opportunity, lead to laws, regulations and institutions that favour the powerful, and perpetuate discrimination against certain groups, such as women; and further discusses the negative effects of economic inequalities on a range of civil, political, economic, social and cultural rights...[He proposed] an agenda for the future for tackling inequality, including: committing to reduce extreme inequality; giving economic, social and cultural rights the same prominence and priority as are given to civil and political rights; recognizing the right to social protection; implementing fiscal policies specifically aimed at reducing inequality; revitalizing and giving substance to the right to equality; and putting questions of resource redistribution at the centre of human rights debates."

In late October 2016, Alston released a scathing report to the UN General Assembly, calling the UN's refusal to accept responsibility for the devastating 2010 Haiti cholera outbreak a "disgrace." The "deadly cholera bacterium" was imported to Haiti in 2010 by infected UN peacekeepers "who were relocated from Nepal" without first being "screened for the illness". The screening would have cost "as little as $2,000." The report criticized the "flawed and unfounded" advice given by the UN's Office of Legal Affairs (OLA), that he blames for preventing the UN from accepting responsibility for the outbreak. According to Alston, "The UN's explicit and unqualified denial of anything other than a moral responsibility is a disgrace. If the United Nations bluntly refuses to hold itself accountable for human rights violations, it makes a mockery of its efforts to hold governments and others to account." Alston said that the UN appeared to have been pressed by United States, the "main contributor to the UN's peacekeeping budget", to "adopt the position frequently taken by lawyers in the US that responsibility should never be accepted voluntarily, since it could complicate future litigation." Alston explained that "this rationale is completely inapplicable to the UN", which unlike the justice system in the United States, "enjoys absolute immunity from suit in national courts and whose reputation depends almost entirely on being seen to act with integrity." Alston expressed concern that the "$400m financial package being put together by the UN" might face funding hurdles. "If you deny responsibility then it's much harder to raise money, to mobilise resources because it becomes just another general development problem... And I think the UN has actually exacerbated the problem significantly through its denials for many years." In his opening and closing statements, Alston called on advocacy groups like the Boston-based Institute for Justice and Democracy in Haiti (IJDH) and the Haiti-based  (BAI) to continue their work, and to keep up pressure on UN Member States.

In 2017 the United Nations undertook an investigation on the effects of systemic poverty in the United States. In a 29 November 2017 Office of the United Nations High Commissioner for Human Rights (OHCHR) statement, Alston observed, "Some might ask why a UN Special Rapporteur on extreme poverty and human rights would visit a country as rich as the United States. But despite great wealth in the US, there also exists great poverty and inequality...[He will] focus on how poverty affects the civil and political rights of people living within the US, given the United States' consistent emphasis on the importance it attaches to these rights in its foreign policy...[He will investigate] the "criminal justice system, welfare and healthcare, barriers to political participation, homelessness, and basic social rights such as the right to social protection, housing, water and sanitation." In November 2017, the American Society of Tropical Medicine and Hygiene (ASTMH) published a report on an outbreak of hookworm in Alabama, which is a disease of extreme poverty. Hookworm, an intestinal parasite, an endemic tropical disease, is listed as a neglected tropical disease. It was thought to have been "slowly eradicated" in the United States starting in the 1930s. It is found in areas that have "[i]nadequate public health services and a general lack of basic citizen knowledge of health and hygiene" and reflects a "weak public education system." The UN investigation includes areas in California, Alabama, Georgia, Puerto Rico, Washington, D.C., and West Virginia. In December 2017, Alston reported that in "a community in Butler County, Alabama he found raw sewage flowing "from homes through exposed PVC pipes and into open trenches and pits." Alston was given a tour of Skid Row by General Dogon-"50 blocks of concentrated human humiliation"—in the center of downtown Los Angeles. According to The Guardian, there was a surge in the cost of housing following the "tech boom for the 0.001%". In the early 2010s, Google, Microsoft, Facebook, YouTube and startups Hulu, Demand Media, Snapchat opened offices in Los Angeles' neighbourhoods, Santa Monica Venice, and Playa del Rey tech boom for the 0.001%, Los Angeles has the largest population of homeless people in the United States. By December 2017, their numbers increased 25% to 55,000.

In autumn 2018, Alston did a two-week fact-finding tour of the United Kingdom where he met with people living in poverty, spoke with civil society front line workers, work coaches, and local, devolved and UK governments, "and visited community organisations, social housing, a Jobcentre, a food bank, an advice center, a library, and a primary school." He met with politicians from all major political parties, Welsh and central government ministers and Scotland's First Minister. In a statement released on 16 November he said for almost half of the nation's children to be poor today is "not just a disgrace, but a social calamity and an economic disaster, all rolled into one", the government's approach to poverty is not guided by economics but "a commitment to achieving radical social re-engineering", and the government should adopt policies that ensure the poor do not have to shoulder the largest share of the ongoing financial burden to the nation arising from Brexit.

Alston said the UK government caused "great misery" with "punitive, mean-spirited, and often callous" austerity measures, and roughly 14 million people, one in five of the UK population, experience poverty and 1.5 million are destitute, cannot pay for basic essentials. He cited statistics from the Institute for Fiscal Studies and the Joseph Rowntree Foundation, and noted particularly predictions that child poverty could increase by 7% between 2015 and 2022, possibly reaching 40%. He said, "It is patently unjust and contrary to British values that so many people are living in poverty," and added that compassion had been given up during nearly a decade of austerity so severe that key parts of the postwar social contract, William Beveridge worked out over 70 years ago, had been lost. Alston visited towns and cities including London, Oxford, Cardiff, Newcastle, Glasgow and Belfast, then Alston said “obvious to anyone who opens their eyes to see the immense growth in food banks and the queues waiting outside them, the people sleeping rough in the streets, the growth of homelessness, the sense of deep despair that leads even the government to appoint a minister for suicide prevention and civil society to report in depth on unheard-of levels of loneliness and isolation”. A government spokesperson stated that average household incomes were at a record high, income inequality had fallen and that universal credit, which Alston attacked as "Orwellian" and "fast falling into universal discredit", was supporting people into work faster.

As special rapporteur on extreme poverty and human rights, he received support from the New York University School of law which received to this end several grants from the Ford Foundation and the Open Society Foundation.

Other
Alston also directed a project funded by the European Commission, which resulted in the publication of a Human Rights Agenda for the European Union for the Year 2000 and a 1999 volume of essays (The European Union and Human Rights). Many of its recommendations were subsequently implemented by the European Commission and the European Council. He also is one of 29 signatories to the Yogyakarta Principles.

Alston was appointed an Officer of the Order of Australia for "distinguished service to the law, particularly in the area of international human rights, and to legal education" in the 2021 Queen's Birthday Honours.

Publications
Alston has written on issues such as economic, social and cultural rights, United Nations institutions and procedures, labour rights, the role of non-state actors in relation to human rights, comparative bills of rights, the use of force, and human rights and development policies. He is also one of the authors of a textbook in the field entitled International Human Rights in Context, Law, Politics, Morals, published by Oxford University Press. A third edition was published in 2007.

In a 2017 article in the  Journal of Human Rights Practice, faced with the rise of populism, Alston called for a reframing of "economic and social rights as human rights rather than as welfare or development objectives." He also called on academics, those who are anti- and pro- human rights, to pay attention to the "unintended consequences of their scholarship."

His 2019 article with Bassam Khawaja and Rebecca Riddell, "Much Ado About Poverty," provided a behind the scenes account of the role of a UN Special Rapporteur, "in investigating and evaluating the situation of people in poverty in a wide range of countries."

References

External links
Philip Alston: Record AfPak Drone Attacks Under Obama May Violate International Law – video report by Democracy Now!
Project on Extrajudicial Executions, Center for Human Rights and Global Justice, New York University School of Law
NYU Law launches Institute for Executive Education, NYU Law Institute for Executive Education, New York University School of Law
Q&A: U.N.'s poverty and human rights special rapporteur finds U.S. policies reward wealthy, punish poor. Interview in the Los Angeles Times, June 2, 2018.
Philip Alston - Contributor profile, EJIL: Talk!

Australian legal scholars
Academic staff of the Australian National University
Academic staff of the European University Institute
Harvard Law School faculty
International law scholars
Living people
Melbourne Law School alumni
Officers of the Order of Australia
Tufts University faculty
UNICEF people
United Nations special rapporteurs
UC Berkeley School of Law alumni
New York University School of Law faculty
Australian officials of the United Nations
Year of birth missing (living people)